The Hollywood Hills are a landform and a historic neighborhood in Los Angeles, California, United States.

Hollywood Hills may also refer to:
 "Hollywood Hills" (song), by Sunrise Avenue
 Hollywood Hills Amphitheater at Walt Disney World Resort in Florida
 Hollywood Hills High School in Hollywood, Florida
 Hollywood Hills West, a neighborhood of Los Angeles